Irmgard Schneeberger, also known by her pen name Sandra Paretti (Regensburg, 5 February 1935 - Zurich, 13 March 1994) was a German writer.

Works
 Rose und Schwert (1967)
 Lerche und Löwe (1969)
 Purpur und Diamant (1971)
 Marlott 1970 (wieder als Clubausgabe in Anthologie von 1982: Das Beste von Konsalik… u.a.)
 Der Winter, der ein Sommer war (1972), 
 als Heyne Taschenbuch; Wilhelm Heyne Verlag, München 1977, .
 Die Pächter der Erde (1975)
 Der Wunschbaum (1975), 
 Das Zauberschiff (1977)
 Maria Canossa (1979)
 Das Echo deiner Stimme (1980)
 Paradiesmann (1983)
 Märchen aus einer Nacht (1985)
 Südseefieber (1986)
 Tara Calese (1988)
 Laura Lumati (1988)
 Mein Regensburger Welttheater (1989)
 Im Nixenkahn der Donau (1996)

Bibliography
 
 
 Bernhard M. Baron, Sandra Paretti in Weiden. „Vielleicht bin ich doch eine Weidnerin?“, In: OBERPFÄLZER HEIMAT Bd. 50 (2006) Weiden i. d. OPf., S. 71 – 80. .

References

External links

1935 births
1994 suicides
Writers from Regensburg
Suicides in Switzerland
1994 deaths